Roland Blanche (31 December 1943 – 13 September 1999) was a French actor.

Filmography

External links 
 

1943 births
1999 deaths
People from Choisy-le-Roi
French male film actors
French male stage actors
French male television actors
20th-century French male actors